The 2010 British Academy Scotland New Talent Awards were held on 19 March 2010 at the Mitchell Theatre in Glasgow. Presented by BAFTA Scotland, the accolades honour the best upcoming talent in the field of film and television in Scotland. The Nominees were announced on 10 March 2010.

Winners and nominees

Winners are listed first and highlighted in boldface.

Special Award for Student Work
Maria's Way

References

External links
BAFTA Scotland Home page

New Talent
British Academy Scotland
2010 in Scotland
2010s in Glasgow
BAF
BAF
BAF
BAFTA
March 2010 events in the United Kingdom